Shanhua is a railway station on the Taiwan Railways Administration West Coast line located in Shanhua District, Tainan, Taiwan.

History
The station was opened on 15 May 1901.

Nearby stations
Taiwan Railways Administration
  ⇐ West Coast line ⇒

See also
 List of railway stations in Taiwan

References

1901 establishments in Taiwan
Railway stations in Tainan
Railway stations opened in 1901
Railway stations served by Taiwan Railways Administration